S.Bharathi Kannan is an Indian film director, who has directed Tamil films. He was primarily active in the 1990s and early 2000 and is most noted for his work on devotional films.

Career
He started his career in 1981, joining as an assistant director to Nellai Sunderrajan and went on to continue such roles for the next fifteen years, while appearing in a few supporting roles as actor notably in Nethiyadi and Jadikketha Moodi (1989). He then apprenticed for a series of films under director K. Shankar, while looking for a producer for his first script. Meanwhile, he also worked as a distributor for films, releasing Guna and Pandiyan in Tirunelveli.

Bharathi Kannan made his first film Aruva Velu in 1996 and won average reviews for his work. He was given the opportunity to produce a medium budget action film Thirunelveli (2000) by R. B. Choudary featuring Prabhu in the lead role, but the film became a box office failure. He then made a series of Hindu devotional films Sri Raja Rajeshwari (2001) and Sri Bannari Amman (2002), with a critic labelling the latter as "terrible", noting that "the director of the film has specialised in making such films, which is meant for illiterates."

In 2004, he directed Vayasu Pasanga, a coming-of-age story of youngsters though critics gave the film's negative reviews with a reviewer noting "after directing some devotionals, Bharathi Kannan tries his hand at a different subject. But if this is the stuff he has to offer, he would do better to stick to his socio-religious genre". He later started making a film titled Kaadhal Kaaviyam starring Livingston and Vindhya, but the film was later stalled.

His most recent directorial venture was Karagattakkari which went unnoticed and Bharathikannan opted against directing any films and started acting in supporting roles in films and television serials notably Kolangal and Rajakumari.

Filmography

Director

Actor

TV Series

References

External links

Living people
Tamil film directors
Telugu film directors
1962 births
People from Tirunelveli
Film directors from Tamil Nadu
20th-century Indian film directors
21st-century Indian male actors
Male actors in Tamil cinema
Male actors from Tamil Nadu